Tal Benyerzi (born 12 December 1989), also mononymously known as TAL, is an Israeli-French singer. She was signed to Warner Music France from 2011 to 2018. In 2021, she changed her artist name to TALOULA and became an independent artist.

Biography

Tal Benyerzi was born in Hadera, Israel. Her family immigrated to Paris (France) before her first birthday. Her name means "morning dew" in Hebrew. She was born into a musical home. Her father was a guitar player, her mother a professional singer under the name Sem Azar. Her brother is a songwriter, her aunt Ronit is a world music/percussionist singer in Miami and her cousin Mor is a jazz singer in New-York.

Her mom was pregnant on stage with her. Tal therefore believes she was singing before she was born. At the age of 12, Tal began to play piano and guitar as a self-taught and enrolled in hip-hop dance lessons and modern jazz for 5 years. She also took part in a theater group called Compagnie Les Sales Gosses until her 16 years old. At 19 years old, she started playing in piano bars in her town Paris, making interpretations of classics Soul/R&B songs.

At 19, Tal met a songwriter and producer L'Aura Marciano, who signed her to Sony Music for 2 years. She released one single "La musique est mon ange". in 2011, Tal signed with Warner Music France and released her debut album Le droit de rêver with pop melodies, urban rhythm and at times classical arrangements. Collaborations included Sean Paul in "Waya Waya" mixed by Veronica Ferraro, L'Algérino in a remake "Le sens de la vie" and John Hanes as sound engineer.

Her first single from the album was "On avance" which reached No. 29 in SNEP, the official French singles chart. That was followed by "Waya Waya". Her biggest hit was "Le sens de la vie" from the album. It reached No. 4 in the French charts. The album also contains a bonus version of the song featuring French-Algerian L'Algérino as a bonus track. 

Tal remains involved in charity. She was the spokesman for MTV's campaign for support of the French AIDS charity Sidaction.

She has been a member of the Les Enfoirés charity ensemble since 2013.

Discography

Albums
Studio albums

Live albums

Singles

Other releases
2012: "Le sens de la vie" (Tal featuring L'Algérino) (charting separately from the solo version in France)

Featured in

2014 - Une autre person with Little Mix (Salute album, deluxe edition for France).

Awards and nominations
In January 2013, she was nominated for "Francophone revelation of the Year" at the NRJ Music Awards.
In December 2013, 2014, 2016, and 2017 she won "Francophone Female Artist of the Year" at the NRJ Music Awards.

References

External links

Official website
Facebook
Twitter
TalTV on YouTube

1989 births
Living people
21st-century Israeli women singers
Israeli emigrants to France
Israeli people of Algerian-Jewish descent
Israeli people of Yemeni-Jewish descent
Warner Music France artists
21st-century French women singers